Events from the year 1830 in Canada.

Incumbents
Monarch: George IV (died June 26), William IV (starting June 26)

Federal government
Parliament of Lower Canada: 13th 
Parliament of Upper Canada: 10th (until March 6)

Governors
Governor of the Canadas: James Kempt
Governor of New Brunswick: Howard Douglas
Governor of Nova Scotia: Thomas Nickleson Jeffery
Civil Governor of Newfoundland: Thomas John Cochrane
Governor of Prince Edward Island: John Ready

Events
Influenza epidemic strikes tribes of British Columbia.
Canada is divided into counties.
William Lyon Mackenzie re-elected to the Assembly with a Reform minority.
 Ridout's Hardware Store, later known as Aikenhead's Hardware opens in Toronto.

Births
March 1 – James Armstrong, politician (died 1893)
August 7 – Thomas White, journalist and politician (died 1888)
November 18 – Michel Auger, politician (died 1909)

Full date unknown
Crowfoot, a chief of the Siksika First Nation (died 1890)
Benjamin Allen, politician (died 1912)

Deaths
June 24 – François Blanchet, author, physician, teacher, militia officer, businessman, seigneur, politician, office holder (born 1776)
September 6 – Abraham Erb, Mennonite settler and miller who founded Waterloo, Ontario (born 1772)

References 

 
Canada
Years of the 19th century in Canada
1830 in North America